Nordenskiold Glacier, is a large glacier in the Avannaata Municipality, on the northwestern coast of Greenland.

Geography
This glacier is located in the Lauge Koch Coast of Melville Bay, north of the Upernavik Archipelago.
It drains the Greenland ice sheet and flows southwestwards between the King Oscar Glacier to the northwest and the Sverdrup Glacier to the southeast.

See also
List of glaciers in Greenland

References

External links
NSIDC Picture
Glaciers of Greenland